The 2019–20 season was Tottenham Hotspur's 28th season in the Premier League and 42nd successive season in the top division of the English football league system. Along with the Premier League, the club did in the FA Cup and the EFL Cup. The club also competed in the UEFA Champions League after finishing fourth last season.

The season started poorly for Tottenham, with only three of their first 12 league games won as well as being knocked out of the EFL Cup by Colchester United. This resulted in Mauricio Pochettino being sacked on 19 November 2019, to be replaced by José Mourinho the following day. In the FA Cup Tottenham twice were taken to a replay and in the fifth round were drawn at home to Norwich City. The game went into extra time and with the result ending in 1–1, it came down to penalties. Norwich won the game 3–2 after the shootout.

With the onset of the Coronavirus pandemic, Premier League football matches were postponed in March, including Tottenham's games against Manchester United and West Ham. A further joint statement from the Premier League and UEFA extended postponement until 30 April. The season's postponement was again extended, this time indefinitely.

The season for Tottenham restarted on 19 June, where they played Manchester United to a 1–1 draw with Steven Bergwijn on the scoresheet.

The season has seen Tottenham taking the least amount of shots since Opta began collecting data during the 1997-98 Season. Several of these games were also plagued by controversial VAR decisions. Two of which were a handball called against Lucas Moura that resulted in Harry Kane's goal against Sheffield United being disallowed, as well as a penalty not given against Bournemouth in which Joshua King pushed Kane from behind in the box. The Premier League later confirmed that this was, in fact, the wrong decision.

The season was documented in the Amazon Prime Video series All or Nothing: Tottenham Hotspur.

Squad

Season squad

Transfers

Released

Loans in

Loans out

Transfers in

Transfers out

Overall transfer activity

Expenditure 
Summer:  £90,000,000

Winter: £27,000,000

Total:  £117,000,000

Income 
Summer:  £30,900,000

Winter:  £0

Total:  £30,900,000

Net totals 
Summer:  £59,100,000

Winter:  £27,000,000

Total:  £86,100,000

Pre-season and friendlies
Tottenham took part again in the 2019 International Champions Cup as defending champions. They played in Singapore and Shanghai. They also took part in the 2019 Audi Cup in Munich.

2019 International Champions Cup

Audi Cup

Mid-season friendlies

Competitions

Overview
{| class="wikitable" style="text-align: center"
|-
!rowspan=2|Competition
!colspan=8|Record
|-
!
!
!
!
!
!
!
!
|-
| Premier League

|-
| FA Cup

|-
| EFL Cup

|-
| Champions League

|-
! Total

Premier League

League table

Results summary

Results by matchday

Matches
On 13 June 2019, the Premier League fixtures were announced.

FA Cup

The third round draw was made on 2 December 2019. The fourth round draw was made by Alex Scott and David O'Leary on Monday, 6 January.

EFL Cup

The third round draw was made on 28 August 2018 by Andy Hinchcliffe and Don Goodman.

UEFA Champions League

Tottenham entered the competition in the group stage following their fourth-place finish in the 2018–19 season. Spurs were drawn with Bayern Munich, Olympiacos and Red Star Belgrade. The draw for the last 16 took place on 16 December 2019 in which Tottenham were drawn against RB Leipzig.

Group stage

Knockout phase

Round of 16

Statistics

Appearances

Goal scorers 
The list is sorted by shirt number when total goals are equal.

Own goals

Clean sheets
The list is sorted by shirt number when total clean sheets are equal.

References 

Tottenham Hotspur
Tottenham Hotspur F.C. seasons
Tottenham
Tottenham
Tottenham Hotspur